The island nation of Kiribati first participated in the 2004 Summer Olympics. It has competed at every Summer Games since then but has not yet entered the Winter Olympics.

After participating in the Commonwealth Games for the first time in 1998, Kiribati started working towards membership of the International Olympic Committee. During a meeting of the IOC in Prague in 2003, Kiribati was accepted into the organization and was set to participate in the 2004 Summer games. The country's name was notably mispronounced by officials in all three languages—French, English and Greek—during the opening ceremony. Its delegation consisted of weightlifter Meamea Thomas and sprinters Kakianako Nariki (Kiribati's first Olympic competitor) and Kaitinano Mwemweata.

History 

Kiribati wanted to join the Olympics in the 1980s. Their National Olympic Committee was created in 2002, and approved by the IOC in 2003.

Facilities and training 

When the athletes train on their own, they typically run barefoot. The 80-90 I-Kiribati athletes have to share the ten pairs of shoes that they have when they train on their track, made of crushed coral. The lanes are black coral, with white beach sand sprinkled to mark the lanes. During the rainy season, the track floods, although the athletes still train on it.

The weightlifters do not have a gym to train in; they train behind their coach's house. If it starts raining, the weightlifters stop practicing.

Medal tables

Medals by Summer Games

Flag bearers
: Meamea Thomas
: David Katoatau
: David Katoatau
: David Katoatau
: Kinaua Biribo, Ruben Katoatau

References

External links
 
 
 
 "Kiribati's Olympic adventure", Andrew Fraser, BBC, August 3, 2004
 

 
Olympics